Emma Iozzelli  (born 12 June 1966) is an Italian footballer who played as a defender for the Italy women's national football team. She was part of the team at the 1991 FIFA Women's World Cup. At club level she played for Reggiana in Italy.

References

External links
 

1966 births
Living people
Italian women's footballers
Italy women's international footballers
Place of birth missing (living people)
1991 FIFA Women's World Cup players
Women's association football defenders
A.S.D. Reggiana Calcio Femminile players
Torres Calcio Femminile players
A.C.F. Prato players
Serie A (women's football) players